Jonathan Barry Boyle (21 October 1944 – 7 August 1999) was an Australian professional wrestler who is known worldwide under the name "Lord" Jonathan Boyd. Initially Boyd competed both in North American and international promotions as part of the Royal Kangaroos with his cousin Norman Frederick Charles III. Later on Boyd would team up with Luke Williams as the Sheepherders and compete in many North American federations such as Continental Wrestling Association, Southeast Championship Wrestling and Southwest Championship Wrestling. Boyd would also act as a manager for Luke and Butch Miller as they competed under the "Sheepherder" name.

Professional wrestling career

Boyle made his professional wrestling debut in 1966, wrestling initially in his native Australia before he and his cousin travelled to North America to compete as The Royal Kangaroos, a name inspired by the legendary tag team the Fabulous Kangaroos. 

Boyle and Charles worked mainly for Pacific Northwest Wrestling in Oregon, capturing their first NWA Pacific Northwest Tag Team Championship from Kurt and Karl Von Steiger on 11 July 1971, their first reign lasted only 6 weeks but the cousins would win the tag team title a further four times between June 1971 and December 1975. Boyd would also work in the singles ranks capturing the main NWA Pacific Northwest title on 31 July 1971 when he defeated Kurt Von Steiner for the NWA Pacific Northwest Heavyweight Championship. Boyd lost the title to Dutch Savage only to regain it a month later on 28 November. On 28 December, Savage once again beat Boyd for the title and subsequently managed to keep it away from him.

After working for Pacific Northwest, the Royal Kangaroos headed further north to join Stu Hart's Stampede Wrestling promotion. In June 1977, the duo defeated Leo Burke and Keith Hart for the Stampede International Tag Team Championship but dropped it to Leo Burke and his new tag team partner Bobby Burke only a short time later. After their run in Stampede together, the Royal Kangaroos broke up after a disagreement in Calgary Canada over differences in how to promote themselves. Charles remained with Stampede for some time while Jonathan Boyd returned to the Pacific Northwest. On 22 August 1978, Boyd defeated Ed Wiskoski (the future Colonel DeBeers) to win his third NWA Pacific Northwest title. Boyd reigned for six months until he was defeated by PNW's fastest rising star "Rowdy" Roddy Piper.

After his run with PNW ended Boyd began travelling the other NWA territories working under such names as "Wild Colonial Boy" Johnny Boyd and "Maniac" Jonathan Boyd. His first stop after leaving the Oregon/Washington territory was due south to the Los Angeles area, specifically the NWA Hollywood Wrestling area. In LA, Boyd teamed up with Coloso Colosetti to defeat Hector Guerrero and Barry Orton to win the NWA Americas Tag Team Championship on 18 May 1979, only to turn around and lose the title to "The Twin Devils" the very next day. In September, Boyd made his mark on Georgia Championship Wrestling when he beat Ray Candy for the NWA Georgia Television Championship. The mark was short-lived, as Candy regained the title about 2 weeks later.

The Sheepherders

In 1981, Butch Miller of the Sheepherders decided that he wanted to return closer to home and went to Australia to wrestle. Luke remained in the United States and started teaming with Boyd as "the Kiwi Sheepherders" and "The New Zealand Sheepherders". The duo of Williams and Boyd quickly gained a reputation of one of the most violent, hard hitting teams in the business. One of the first people to feel the wrath of the "new and improved" Sheepherders was Robert Fuller in South Eastern Championship Wrestling. In later 1981, Robert Fuller and Jos LeDuc had split up when LeDuc turned on Fuller during a match. LeDuc brought in the Sheepherders to be a part of his "Commonwealth Connection" to fight against Robert Fuller and the entire Fuller family. In December 1981, the Sheepherders won the NWA Southeast Tag Team Championship that had been vacated when Fuller and LeDuc split and defended the titles against Robert Fuller and various partners including his brother Ron Fuller and his cousin Jimmy Golden (later known as Bunkhouse Buck). One act that made the Sheepherders the most hated men in SECW for a while was when the duo attacked and injured (storyline) Jimmy's father Billy Golden. Williams and Boyd kept the upper hand for months as Robert Fuller recruited partner after partner to defeat the dastardly duo. On 11 September 1982, the Sheepherders were finally defeated by Fuller and Golden ending the feud on a high for the face duo as the Sheepherders were "run out" of the territory.

Boyd and Williams moved slightly more north as they began to work in the Memphis, TN based promotion Continental Wrestling Association owned and operated by Jerry Jarrett and Jerry Lawler. Making their debut in October 1982 the team quickly became involved in a heated feud with Jacques Rougeau and Terry Taylor, clashing week after week at the Mid-South Coliseum with the Sheepherders brawling their way to victory time and again. Taylor and Rougeau redeemed themselves in the end by defeating the Sheepherders in a brutal "Coal Miner's Glove" match. Showing how incredibly resilient the duo was, they returned to the ring later in the night and defeated the territory's main stars Jerry Lawler and Bill Dundee.

The next feud for Boyd and Williams stands as their most memorable and certainly their most bloody and brutal as the team kicked off a long running feud with The Fabulous Ones (Stan Lane and Steve Keirn). The "pretty boy", well polished Fabulous Ones made and the ugly, brawling savage Sheepherders made for the perfect opponents and repeatedly drew big gates all over the country. The matches started out pretty evenly with the Fabulous Ones and the Sheepherders splitting the decisions but soon turned brutal and often without a definite winner. In late 1982, the Sheepherders won the AWA Southern Tag Team Championship from Lane and Keirn which only turned the intensity of the matches up a notch. Between late December and Mid February, the two teams traded the belts back and forth 4 times with the Fabulous Ones ending up with possession of them in the end. On 28 March, the Sheepherders wrestled their last match in the Mid-South Coliseum before leaving the CWA.

Boyd and Williams resurfaced in Southwest Championship Wrestling only weeks later, continuing their brutal and destructive ways. Their first target was the reigning Southwest Tag Team Champions "The Grapplers" (Len Denton and Tony Anthony). In May, the Sheepherders won the gold from the duo through nefarious means: before the match Williams and Boyd had bribed the Grapplers' manager Don Carson and promised he would become a tag team champion; Carson turned on the Grapplers mid-match to ensure the Sheepherders' victory. The Sheepherders' run with the gold was short-lived because, in June, Jonathan Boyd legitimately broke both his legs in a car accident, which forced the SWCW to name Bobby Jaggers as a replacement for Boyd. After Williams and Jagger lost a non-title match to Bob Sweetan and Sweet Brown Sugar, Williams turned on Jaggers and the titles were vacated. While Boyd was out with the broken leg, Williams was reunited with his old tag-team partner, Butch, straight in from Australia. Once Boyd was recovered enough, he began acting as the Sheepherders' manager despite still on crutches. Over the next year or two, Boyd works mainly as a manager for the Sheepherders and as a booker for SWCW.

In 1985, Boyd once again began wrestling as a Sheepherder, but this time he did not team up with Luke Williams but instead teamed with Rip Morgan (a former flag bearer for the Sheepherders) and continued the Sheepherder legacy of violence under the name "The Kiwi Sheepherders". Boyd and Morgan quickly made a mark on Memphis by beating their longtime opposition the Fabulous Ones for AWA Southern Tag Team Championship on 17 June 1985. The team was soon stripped of the titles due to excessive cheating, but had the titles returned to them when Boyd and Morgan threatened to sue CWA management. Instead of taking the titles from the Sheepherders by stripping them, the Fabulous Ones took the Southern tag team titles from them the old fashioned way – 4 times in a row between 5 September and 12 October. 

After the series of violent matches with the Fabulous Ones came to an end, the Sheepherders came face to face with another team that would turn out to be a constant thorn in their side: The Fantastics (Bobby Fulton and Tommy Rogers). Jonathan Boyd reunited with the Sheepherders in the World Wrestling Council in Puerto Rico. In the winter of 1985, the Kiwi Sheepherders and the Fantastics traded wins back and forth with no side gaining a clear advantage in their feud. In January 1986, the Kiwi Sheepherders defeated the teams of Koko Ware and Rick Casey and also the team of Tojo Yamamoto and Dirty Rhodes to reach the finals of a tournament to crown new Southern Tag Team Champions, but in the finals they fell to the Fantastics. The loss to the Fantastics only intensified the Sheepherders' anger, bringing the feud to its high point as the two teams clashed in a "No DQ Loser Leaves Town" match on 20 January 1986. The Kiwi Sheepherders lost and left Memphis while the Fantastics rode a wave of popularity thanks to the feud.

In late November, the Kiwi Sheepherders returned to the CWA for a brief run. Boyd and Bob Hallow (billed as "Bigfoot") cut through the competition and won a 4th Southern Tag Team championship when they beat Jeff Jarrett and Billy Joe Travis in a tournament to crown new tag team champions. Their run with the titles was brief as Jarrett and Travis won the titles a week later and then ran the Kiwi Sheepherders out of the area in a "Loser Leaves Town" match a week after beating them for the title.

After the Sheepherders
On 11 January 1988, Boyd defeated Ranger Ross for the NWA Alabama Heavyweight Championship in Continental Championship Wrestling. Boyd held the title for just over a month before dropping the gold to "Doctor" Tom Prichard. On 28 December of that year, Boyd won his last title when he defeated Joe Savoldi for the ICW Heavyweight Title (Savoldi version). Boyd once again only held the title briefly losing it back to Joe Savoldi in January 1989.

On 25 December 1989, "Lord" Jonathan Boyd lost to Rex King in his retirement match in Portland, Oregon for the same promotion that gave him his first break in the US, Pacific Northwest Wrestling. He returned to wrestling on March 11, 1991 for World Championship Wrestling's TV Tapings teaming a six-men tag with Mark Kyle, and Joe Cruz losing to The Young Pistols, Tracy Smothers, Steve Armstrong and Dustin Rhodes. His last match was later on August 10 in Portland, Oregon, in Pacific Northwest Wrestling where he went to a double countout against The Grappler under the name Johnny Miller.

Boyd died on 7 August 1999, aged 54, of a heart attack.

Personal life
Boyd owned a DeLorean. He has been divorced three times and moved to Portland, Oregon in 1987.

Championships and accomplishments
All-South Wrestling Alliance
ASWA Georgia Tag Team Championship (2 times) – with Norman Frederick Charles III
Continental Wrestling Association
AWA Southern Tag Team Championship (7 times) – with Luke Williams (2) and Rip Morgan (5)
Georgia Championship Wrestling
NWA Georgia Television Championship (1 time)
International World Class Championship Wrestling
IWCCW Heavyweight Championship (1 time)
Mid-Atlantic Championship Wrestling
NWA Mid-Atlantic Brass Knuckles Championship (1 time)
NWA Mid-Atlantic Brass Knuckles Tag Team Championship (1 time) – with Norman Frederick Charles III
NWA Hollywood Wrestling
NWA Americas Tag Team Championship (1 time) – with Coloso Colosetti
Pacific Northwest Wrestling
NWA Pacific Northwest Heavyweight Championship (3 times)
NWA Pacific Northwest Tag Team Championship (7 times) – with Norman Frederick Charles III (6) and Dutch Savage (1)
Ring Around The Northwest Newsletter
Wrestler of the Year (1971)
Tag Team of the Year (1975) with Norman Frederick Charles III
Southeastern Championship Wrestling – Continental Wrestling Federation
NWA Alabama Heavyweight Championship (1 time)
NWA Southeastern Tag Team Championship (1 time) – with Luke Williams
Southwest Championship Wrestling – Texas All-Star Wrestling
SWCW Southwest Tag Team Championship (1 time) – with Luke Williams
Texas All-Star USA 6-Man Tag Team Championship
Stampede Wrestling
NWA International Tag Team Championship (Calgary version) (1 time) – with Norman Frederick Charles III
Other titles
South Pacific World Tag Team Championship (1 time) – with Norman Frederick Charles III

References

External links 
 
The Strange Life and Times of Jonathan Boyd by Mark Nulty
The Turnbuckle: Home of the Royal Kangaroos in Cyberspace

1944 births
1999 deaths
20th-century professional wrestlers
Australian male professional wrestlers
ICW/IWCCW Heavyweight Champions
NWA Americas Tag Team Champions
Sportsmen from New South Wales
Sportspeople from Sydney
Stampede Wrestling alumni